The 2011 Australian GT Championship was an Australian motor racing competition open to closed, production based sports cars which are either approved by the FIA for GT3 competition or approved by the Confederation of Australian Motor Sport (CAMS) for Australian GT. It was sanctioned by CAMS as a National Championship with the Australian GT Sportscar Group Pty Ltd appointed by CAMS as the Category Manager. The championship, which was the 15th Australian GT Championship, incorporated drivers titles in two divisions, GT Championship and GT Challenge. The former GT Production division was merged into the GT Challenge division for 2011.

Mark Eddy won his second GT Championship. Driving his Melbourne Performance Centre prepared Audi R8 LMS the 2008 champion finished 36 points ahead of Klark Quinn (Mosler MT900 GT3 and Aston Martin DBRS9) and 99 points ahead of 2006 champion Greg Crick (Chrysler Viper GT3). Eddy only won one round, but it was the bonus point Phillip Island event at Round 5. Eddy also won races at Winton and Bathurst. Quinn won two races at the street circuits of Adelaide and Townsville, but fell behind Eddy after failing to finish in the second race at Phillip Island. Crick fell behind Eddy after failing to score any points at Bathurst. Peter Hackett, Dean Grant and Kevin Weeks all claimed race wins during the course of the season.

The GT Challenge division was won by Porsche driver Peter Boylan, defeating Lotus driver Tim Poulton by 63 points. They were the only two GT Challenge drivers to complete more than half of the season.

Drivers

The following drivers contested the 2011 Australian GT Championship.

Race calendar
The championship was contested over a seven-round series.

Points system
Points were awarded in each division at each race according to the following table. 

For Round 5 of the championship only, points were also awarded to each driver based on their fastest lap time achieved in qualifying relative to the other drivers within their division of the championship, in accordance with the above table.

The results for each round of the championship were determined by the number of points scored by each driver within their division at that round.

The driver gaining the highest points total over all rounds of the Championship within their division was declared the winner of that division.

Championship results

2011 Australian Tourist Trophy
The 2011 Australian Tourist Trophy was awarded by the Confederation of Australian Motor Sport to the driver accumulating the highest aggregate points total from the Eastern Creek and Phillip Island "endurance" rounds of the championship. The title, which was the 22nd Australian Tourist Trophy, was won by Mark Eddy driving an Audi R8 LMS.

References

External links
 Australian GT – Official website
 2011 Race Results Archive

Australian GT Championship
GT Championship